Coeliades ramanatek is a butterfly in the family Hesperiidae. It is found on Madagascar and the Comoros. The habitat consists of forests, forest margins and anthropogenic environments.

Subspecies
Coeliades ramanatek ramanatek (Madagascar)
Coeliades ramanatek comorana Evans, 1937 (Comoros)

References

Butterflies described in 1833
Coeliadinae